Nathan Verela is an American soccer player who plays for LA Galaxy II and the LA Galaxy academy.

Career 
Verela played with the LA Galaxy academy from 2017. He made his professional debut on March 8, 2020, appearing for LA Galaxy's USL Championship side as a 73rd-minute substitute in a 5–1 win over Rio Grande Valley FC.

References

External links
USSF Development Academy bio

2000s births
American soccer players
Association football forwards
LA Galaxy II players
Living people
Soccer players from California
USL Championship players
Association football midfielders
Sportspeople from Riverside County, California
People from Moreno Valley, California